Shanti Nagar Assembly constituency is one of the 224 constituencies in the Karnataka Legislative Assembly of Karnataka a south state of India. It is also part of Bangalore Central Lok Sabha constituency.

Members of Legislative Assembly

Mysore State
 1967: A. Nanjappa, Indian National Congress
 1972: K. R. Sreenivasulu Nayudu, Indian National Congress

Karnataka State
 1978: P. K. Ranganathan, Indian National Congress (Indira)
 1983: P. D. Govinda Raj, Janata Party
 1985: C. Kannan, Indian National Congress
 1989: M. Muniswamy, Indian National Congress
 1994: D. G. Hemavathy, Janata Dal
 1999: M. Muniswamy, Indian National Congress
 2004: S. Raghu, Bharatiya Janata Party
 2008: Nalapad Ahmed Haris, Indian National Congress
 2013: Nalapad Ahmed Haris, Indian National Congress
 2018: Nalapad Ahmed Haris, Indian National Congress

See also
 Bangalore Urban district
 List of constituencies of Karnataka Legislative Assembly

References

Assembly constituencies of Karnataka
Bangalore Urban district